Richland County School District Two (commonly referred to as Richland Two) is a nationally recognized school district located in suburban Columbia, South Carolina, United States, in the northeast section of Richland County. It is one of the fastest growing districts in South Carolina, with a current student population above 28,000.  It operates 40 schools and centers, two district child development programs, two alternative schools, an adult/community center and several magnet centers and programs at all grade levels. The district offices are in an unincorporated area.

For K-12 the district serves Dentsville, Woodfield, most of Arcadia Lakes and Blythewood, and small sections of Columbia and Forest Acres. It serves Fort Jackson at the middle school and senior high school level.

High schools

Richland Two operates five high schools, with twelve magnet programs for high schools.
Ridge View High School 
Spring Valley High School 
Blythewood High School 
Richland Northeast High School 
Westwood High School 
Richland 2 Institute of Innovation

Middle schools 
Richland Two operates seven middle schools, with thirteen magnet programs for middle schools.
Blythewood Middle School 
Dent Middle School
Kelly Mill Middle School 
Longleaf Middle School
Muller Road Middle School
Summit Parkway Middle School
E.L. Wright Middle School

Elementary schools 
Richland Two operates nineteen elementary schools, with nine magnet programs for elementary students located on middle school campuses.

Bethel-Hanberry Elementary School
Bookman Road Elementary School
Bridge Creek Elementary School
Catawba Trail Elementary School
Center for Achievement: (located at Kelly Mill Middle School)
Center for Inquiry (located at Summit Parkway Middle School)
Center for Knowledge (located at E.L. Wright Middle School)
Center for Knowledge North (located at Muller Road Middle School)
Conder Elementary School
Forest Lake Elementary School
Joseph Keels Elementary School
Jackson Creek Elementary School
Killian Elementary School
Lake Carolina Elementary School Lower Campus
Lake Carolina Elementary School Upper Campus
Langford Elementary School
Lonnie B. Nelson Elementary School
North Springs Elementary School
Polo Road Elementary School
Pontiac Elementary School
Rice Creek Elementary School
Round Top Elementary School
Sandlapper Elementary School
Windsor Elementary School

Child Development
Richland Two operates one district-wide child development program.
Richland Two Center for Child Development

Other Schools
Blythewood Academy
R2 Virtual School
W.R. Rogers Adult, Continuing and Technology Education Center (Adult Education)

See also

 Richland County School District One

References

External links 
Richland County School District Two Official Website

Education in Columbia, South Carolina
Education in Richland County, South Carolina
School districts in South Carolina